Louis Pujol (18 August 1790, Paris – 26 August 1855) was Governor General for Inde française in the Second French Colonial Empire during the last years of July Monarchy and during initial period of French Second Republic.

Titles Held

1790 births
1855 deaths
Civil servants from Paris
Governors of French India
People of the French Second Republic
People of the July Monarchy
French military personnel of the Napoleonic Wars